Thomas Alan Shippey (born 9 September 1943) is a British medievalist, a retired scholar of Middle and Old English literature as well as of modern fantasy and science fiction. He is considered one of the world's leading academic experts on the works of J. R. R. Tolkien about whom he has written several books and many scholarly papers. His book The Road to Middle-Earth has been called "the single best thing written on Tolkien".

Shippey's education and academic career have in several ways retraced those of Tolkien: he attended King Edward's School, Birmingham, became a professional philologist, occupied Tolkien's professorial chair at the University of Leeds, and taught Old English at the University of Oxford to the syllabus that Tolkien had devised.

He has received three Mythopoeic Awards and a World Fantasy Award. He participated in the creation of Peter Jackson's The Lord of the Rings film trilogy, assisting the dialect coaches. He featured as an expert medievalist in all three of the documentary DVDs that accompany the special extended edition of the trilogy, and later also that of The Hobbit film trilogy.

Biography

Early life 

Thomas Alan Shippey was born in 1943 to the engineer Ernest Shippey and his wife Christina Emily Kjelgaard in Calcutta, British India, where he spent the first years of his life. He studied at King Edward's School in Birmingham from 1954 to 1960.

Like J. R. R. Tolkien, Shippey became fond of Old English, Old Norse, German and Latin, and of playing rugby. He gained a B.A. from Queens' College, Cambridge, in 1964, his M.A. in 1968, and a PhD in 1970.

Medievalist 

Shippey became a junior lecturer at the University of Birmingham, and then a Fellow of St John's College, Oxford, where he taught Old and Middle English.  In 1979, he was elected to the Chair of English Language and Medieval English Literature at Leeds University, a post once held by Tolkien. In 1996, after 14 years at Leeds, Shippey was appointed to the Walter J. Ong Chair of Humanities at Saint Louis University's College of Arts and Sciences, where he taught, researched, and wrote books. He was a visiting professor at Harvard University, the University of Texas, and Signum University.

He has published over 160 books and articles, and has edited or co-edited scholarly collections such as the 1998 Beowulf: The Critical Heritage and the 2005 Studies in Medievalism. He has written invited forewords to books on medieval England, such as Beowulf and Other Old English Poems. Among his research on the Old English poem Beowulf is an analysis of its principles of conversation, and a much-cited discussion of the "obdurate puzzle" of the "Modthrytho Episode" (Beowulf 1931b–1962), which seems to describe a cruel irrational queen who then becomes a model wife. He has also written on Arthurian legend, including its reworkings in medieval and modern literature. His medieval studies have extended as far as to write a book on the lives of the great Vikings "as warriors, invaders and plunderers", exploring their "heroic mentality in the face of death and warfare". The Swedish author Lars Lönnroth commented that nothing like Shippey's "eminently readable book" had been attempted since Thomas Bartholin's 1677 history of Danish antiquity, even if Shippey's use of legendary sources meant that the materials used could not be relied upon.

Since his retirement and his return to England, he has continued his research as an honorary research fellow at the University of Winchester. His Tolkien scholar colleagues including Janet Brennan Croft, John D. Rateliff, Verlyn Flieger, David Bratman, Marjorie Burns, and Richard C. West marked his 70th birthday with a festschrift.

Modern fantasy and science fiction 

Under the pseudonym of "Tom Allen", Shippey has written two stories that were published in anthologies edited by Peter Weston. The first published was the fantasy story "King, Dragon" in Andromeda 2 in 1977; the second was the science fiction novelette "Not Absolute" in Andromeda 3 in 1978.

Under the pseudonym of "John Holm", he is the co-author, with Harry Harrison, of The Hammer and the Cross trilogy of alternate history novels, consisting of The Hammer and the Cross (1993), One King's Way (1995), and King and Emperor (1996). For Harrison's 1984 West of Eden, Shippey helped with the constructed language, Yilanè.

Shippey has edited both The Oxford Book of Science Fiction Stories, and The Oxford Book of Fantasy Stories. He reviews science fiction for The Wall Street Journal, and contributes literary reviews to the London Review of Books.
In 2009, he wrote a scholarly 21-page introduction to Flights of Eagles, a collection of James Blish's works. He has given many invited lectures on Tolkien and other topics.

Tolkien scholarship 

Shippey's interest in Tolkien began when he was 14 years old and was lent a copy of The Hobbit. Shippey comments on his interest in Tolkien that

In late 1969 or early 1970, Shippey wrote his first academic work on Tolkien. He then delivered a speech at a Tolkien day organised by a student association at the University of Birmingham. This lecture, "Tolkien as philologist" became influential for Shippey's view of Tolkien. Joy Hill, Tolkien's private secretary, was in the audience and afterward, she asked him for the script, for Tolkien to read. On 13 April 1970, Shippey received a seemingly formal letter from Tolkien; he records that it took him 30 years to decode the "specialised politeness-language of Old Western Man" in which Tolkien replies to Shippey's interpretations of his work, even though, Shippey writes, he speaks the same language himself. Tolkien wrote, hinting that Shippey was "nearly" (italics supplied by Shippey) always correct but that Tolkien had not had the time to tell him about his design as it "may be found in a large finished work, and the actual events or experiences as seen or felt by the waking mind in the course of actual composition [i.e. Tolkien's then-unpublished legendarium]"; Shippey used the phrase "Course of actual composition" as the title of the final chapter of The Road to Middle-earth.

Shippey and Tolkien met in 1972 when Shippey was invited for dinner by Norman Davis, who had succeeded Tolkien as the Merton Professor of English Language. When he became a Fellow of St. John's College that same year, Shippey taught Old and Middle English using Tolkien's syllabus.

Shippey's first printed essay, "Creation from Philology in The Lord of the Rings", expanded on his 1970 lecture. In 1979, he was elected into a former position of Tolkien's, the Chair of English Language and Medieval English Literature at Leeds University.  He noted that his office at Leeds, like Tolkien's, was just off Woodhouse Lane, a name that in his view Tolkien would certainly have interpreted as a trace of the woodwoses, the wild men of the woods "lurking in the hills above the Aire".

His first Tolkien book, The Road to Middle-earth, was published in 1982. At this time, Shippey shifted from regarding Tolkien as a philologist to a "traumatised author" as he called it, "writing fantasy, but voicing in that fantasy the most pressing and most immediately relevant issues of the whole monstrous twentieth century – questions of industrialised warfare, the origin of evil, the nature of humanity". This would include writers affected by war like Kurt Vonnegut,  William Golding, and George Orwell. An enlarged third edition was published in 2005; in its preface he states that he had assumed that the 1982 book would be his last word on the subject, and in the text he sets out his view that "the Lord of the Rings in particular is a war-book, also a post-war book", comparing Tolkien's writing to that of other twentieth-century authors.  The book rigorously refutes what was then the long-running literary hostility to Tolkien, and explains to instinctive lovers of Lord of the Rings why they are right to like it. It has been described as "the single best thing written on Tolkien", and "the seminal monograph". The book has received over 900 scholarly citations.

As an acknowledged expert on Tolkien, Shippey serves on the editorial board of Tolkien Studies: An Annual Scholarly Review. Gergely Nagy, reviewing Shippey's festschrift, wrote that Shippey "has
been (and still is) an enabler for all of us in Tolkien Studies: author of the seminal The Road to Middle-earth (first published in 1983) and countless insightful articles, he is the veritable pope of the field."

Family life 

Shippey married Susan Veale in 1966; after that marriage ended, he married Catherine Elizabeth Barton in 1993. He has three children. He retired in 2008, and now lives in Dorset.

Film and television 

Shippey has appeared in several television documentaries, in which he spoke about Tolkien and his Middle-earth writings:

 1984: Tolkien Remembered
 1996: J.R.R.T.: A Film Portrait of J.R.R. Tolkien
 1998: An Awfully Big Adventure: J.R.R. Tolkien

 2002: Page to Screen: The Lord of the Rings 
 2003: J.R.R. Tolkien: Origins of Middle-Earth

He participated in Peter Jackson's The Lord of the Rings film trilogy, for which he assisted the dialect coaches. He was featured on all three of the documentary DVDs that accompany the special extended edition of The Lord of the Rings film trilogy, and later also that of The Hobbit film trilogy. He summarized his experiences with the film project as follows:

Publications 

Apart from his published books, Shippey has written a large number of scholarly articles.

 Books written
 Old English Verse (London: Hutchinson, 1972).
 Poems of Wisdom and Learning in Old English (Cambridge: D.S. Brewer, 1976; 2nd ed., 1977 ).
 Beowulf. Arnold's Studies in English Literature series (London: Edward Arnold, 1978).
 The Road to Middle-earth (London: Allen & Unwin, 1982; Boston: Houghton Mifflin, 1983), 2nd ed. (London: HarperCollins, 1993), Revised and Expanded edition (London: HarperCollins, 2005 ).
 J. R. R. Tolkien: Author of the Century (London: HarperCollins, 2001).
 Literary Genius: 25 Classic Writers Who Define English & American Literature, Essayist (Philadelphia: Paul Dry Books, 2007) (Illustrated by Barry Moser ).
 Roots and Branches: Selected Papers on Tolkien (Zurich and Berne: Walking Tree Publishers, Cormarë Series 11, 2007).
 Hard Reading: Learning from Science Fiction (Liverpool University Press, 2016).
 Laughing Shall I Die: Lives and Deaths of the Great Vikings (Reaktion Books, 2018).
 Beowulf and the North Before the Vikings (Arc Humanities Press, 2022).

 Books edited
 Fictional Space: Essays on Contemporary Science Fiction, (Oxford: Basil Blackwell, 1991).
 The Oxford Book of Science Fiction Stories, (Oxford: Oxford University Press, 1992).
 The Oxford Book of Fantasy Stories, (Oxford: Oxford University Press, 1994 ).
 Beowulf: The Critical Heritage, with Andreas Haarder (New York: Routledge, 1998 ).
 Medievalism in the Modern World: Essays in Honour of Leslie J. Workman, with Richard Utz (Turnhout: Brepols, 1998), .
 The Shadow-Walkers: Jacob Grimm's Mythology of the Monstrous, (Turnhout: Brepols, 2005 ).
 Old English Philology: Studies in Honour of R.D. Fulk, with Leonard Neidorf and Rafael J. Pascual (Cambridge: D.S. Brewer, 2016 ).

Awards and distinctions 

 1984 – Mythopoeic Award, Mythopoeic Scholarship Award for Inkling Studies, The Road to Middle-earth
 2001 – Mythopoeic Award, Mythopoeic Scholarship Award for Inkling Studies, J.R.R. Tolkien: Author of the Century
 2001 – World Fantasy Award, Special Award Professional, J.R.R. Tolkien: Author of the Century

 2008 – Mythopoeic Award, Mythopoeic Scholarship Award for Myth and Fantasy Studies, The Shadow-Walkers: Jacob Grimm's Mythology of the Monstrous
 2014 – Festschrift edited by John Wm. Houghton, Janet Brennan Croft, Nancy Martsch, John D. Rateliff, and Robin Anne Reid: Tolkien in the New Century: Essays in Honor of Tom Shippey

References

External links

 
 Tom Shippey at the London Review of Books, 47 pieces as of October 2022

1943 births
Academics of the University of Leeds
Alumni of the University of Cambridge
Anglo-Saxon studies scholars
British academics of English literature
British speculative fiction critics
Constructed language creators
Linguists from the United Kingdom
Living people
People educated at King Edward's School, Birmingham
Saint Louis University faculty
Science fiction critics
Tolkien Society members
Tolkien studies